Turkey Creek Township may refer to:

 Turkey Creek Township, Stone County, Arkansas
 Turkey Creek Township, Kosciusko County, Indiana
 Turkey Creek Township, Barber County, Kansas
 Turkey Creek Township, Franklin County, Nebraska, in Franklin County, Nebraska
 Turkey Creek Township, Harlan County, Nebraska

See also

Turkey Creek (disambiguation)

Township name disambiguation pages